The Summer Institute for Future Teachers, SIFT is a residential summer program at Eastern Connecticut State University. This program is for students who are interested in exploring the teaching profession and who are going into either their junior or senior years of high schools from all over Connecticut. This program has been running since 1996. The program usually starts in the first week of July and ends in the third week of July.

Curriculum
During the program at ECSU, students learn about behaviorist and constructivist teaching styles and the differences between the two.   

The students also learn about different teaching styles and multiple intelligences. Students also learn about how to write and present a lesson plan.

Books
All students in the SIFT program receive copies of the books, "Multiple Intelligences","The Classroom Teacher's Survival Guide", and "The Great Gilly Hopkins"

Teacher training programs